The Douglas T2D was an American twin-engined torpedo bomber contracted by the military, and required to be usable on wheels or floats, and operating from aircraft carriers. It was the first twin-engined aircraft to be operated from an aircraft carrier.

Development and design
In 1925, the United States Navy's Bureau of Aeronautics designed a twin-engined torpedo bomber aircraft, intended to have greater performance than contemporary single-engined aircraft. A single prototype was built by the Naval Aircraft Factory as the XTN-1, which was quickly followed by three identical aircraft built by Douglas, the T2D-1.

The XTN/T2D was a large two bay biplane, capable of easy conversion between floats and wheels, and carrying a crew of four.

Operational history
The first three T2D-1's were delivered to the torpedo bomber squadron VT-2 on 25 May 1927, being used for successful trials aboard the aircraft carrier . A further nine T2D-1's were ordered in 1927, these normally being operated as floatplanes, partly owing to criticism from the Army of the Navy operating large land-based bombers, and partly as its large size prevented Langley from embarking a full airwing.

A further 18 aircraft were ordered in June 1930 as patrol floatplanes, being designated P2D-1. These were operated by Patrol Squadron VP-3 in the Panama Canal Zone until they were replaced by Consolidated PBYs in 1937.

Variants

XTN-1
Original prototype built by Naval Aircraft Factory. One built.
T2D-1
Production aircraft, convertible torpedo bomber/patrol floatplane, powered by Wright R-1750 Cyclones. 12 built.
P2D-1
Dedicated patrol floatplane. Fitted with twin tail for improved engine out performance and powered by two Wright R-1820 Cyclones. 18 built.

Operators

United States Navy

Specifications (T2D-1 landplane / floatplane)

References

External links

Boeing page for Douglas T2D

T2D
1920s United States bomber aircraft
Biplanes
Aircraft first flown in 1927
Twin piston-engined tractor aircraft